Kirk MacDonald (born 1959) is a Canadian jazz musician and composer. He has been nominated for four Juno Awards, with his album The Atlantic Sessions winning the 1999 Juno Award for Best Mainstream Jazz Album.

He has performed on over forty albums as leader and sideman and has participated in national broadcast recordings for CBC Radio. In addition to performing extensively throughout Canada, he has performed in the U.S., France, Spain, Italy, Holland, Monaco, Australia, Korea, Bermuda, and the Bahamas.

He has worked with Walter Bishop Jr., John Clayton, Rosemary Clooney, Brian Dickinson, Glenn Ferris, Sonny Greenwich, Eddie Henderson, Pat LaBarbera, Lorne Lofsky, Harold Mabern, Ron McClure, Jim McNeely, Vince Mendoza, James Moody, Bob Mover, Phil Nimmons, Sam Noto, Chris Potter, Bernie Senensky, Mike Stern, John Taylor, Kenny Wheeler, André White, and the Humber College Faculty Ensemble.

As a composer, he has recorded over fifty of his own compositions. His compositions have been arranged for large ensembles by  Canadian and American arrangers. He has been active as an educator for almost 25 years at the college and university levels.

Awards and nominations

As leader or soloist 
 2015 – Hagood Hardy Award SOCAN – Outstanding Jazz Artist of the Year
 2015 – Juno Award for Jazz Album of the Year – Solo (Vista Obscura)
 2015 – East Coast Music Award – Best Jazz Recording (Symmetry)
 2015 – Toronto Musicians’ Association – Lifetime Achievement Award
 2012 – Juno Award Nominee – Best Traditional Jazz Album (Deep Shadows)
 2011 – Juno Award Nominee – Best Traditional Jazz Album (Songbook Vol. II)
 2010 – Juno Award Nominee – Best Contemporary Jazz Album (Songbook Vol. 1)
 2009 – the Canada Council’s “Victor Martyn Lynch-Staunton Award”
 2007 – Now Magazine “Saxophonist of the Year”
 2005 – National Jazz Awards Nomination – Saxophonist of the Year
 2004 – National Jazz Awards Nomination – Saxophonist of the Year
 2003 – National Jazz Awards Nomination – Saxophonist of the Year
 2002 – Winner – 4th Concours International de Soliste de Jazz – Monaco
 2001 – Juno Award Nominee – Best Mainstream Jazz Album (New Beginnings)
 2001 – Canadian Indie Music Award Nomination – Best Jazz Recording (New Beginnings)
 1999 – Juno Award – Best Mainstream Jazz Album (The Atlantic Sessions)
 1999 – Jazz Report Awards – Album of the Year (The Atlantic Sessions)
 1999 – Jazz Report Awards – Tenor Saxophonist of the Year
 1996 – Nomination for East Coast Music Award – Jazz Artist of the Year (Reminiscence)

With other artists 
 2009 – Juno Award Nominee – Contemporary Jazz Album of the Year (Existential Detective) (Random Access Large Ensemble)
 2003 – Montreal Jazz Festival Prix de Jazz (Nancy Walker Quartet)
 2001 – Juno Award Nominee – Best Vocal Jazz (This Is How Men Cry) (Marc Jordan) Blue Note Records
 2000 – Juno Award Nominee – Best Mainstream Jazz Album (New Horizons) (Bernie Senensky) Timeless
 1999 – Juno Award Nominee – Best Mainstream Jazz Album (Siren’s Song) (Maritime Jazz Orchestra) Justin Time
 1999 – Montreal Jazz Festival Prix de Jazz (Chris Mitchell Quintet)

Educational Awards 

 2011 Humber College – Distinguished Faculty Award
 2009 Humber College – College Innovation of the Year Award (Music Department)
 2008 Humber College – Teaching Excellence Certificate
 2004/05 Humber College – Award of Excellence for Outstanding Academic Contribution

Discography

As leader  
 Trane of Thought Live at the Rex (Cellar Live) - Recorded at The Rex Jazz & Blues Bar in Toronto on September 20 and 21, 2018
 Generations (HGBS Blue Records Canada) - Recorded at Revolution Recording Studio, Toronto, ON, Canada on March 11 & 12, 2018
 Silent Voices (Jazz Compass) - released February 24, 2017
 Common Ground (Independent) - Recorded at Humber College Studio June 14, 15 2015
 Vista Obscura (ADDO) – Recorded July 27 and 28, 2014 in Toronto, Ontario
 Symmetry (ADDO) – Recorded June 8 and 9, 2013 in Toronto, Ontario
 Family Suite for Large Ensemble (ADDO) – Recorded January 7 and 8, 2012 at Humber Recording Studios in Toronto, Ontario
 Deep Shadows (ADDO) – Recorded May 2, 2010 in Toronto Released April 2011
 Songbook Vol 2 (ADDO) – Recorded June 18 – 21, 2009 at Humber Recording Studios in Toronto, Ontario
 Songbook Vol 1 (ADDO) – Recorded June 18 – 21, 2009 at Humber Recording Studios in Toronto, Ontario
 Family Suite (Romhog) – Recorded at Humber Recording Studios, Toronto, Ontario, August 11 – 13, 2008
 Pure and Simple (Justin Time) – Recorded April 2 & 3, 2001 at AKW Studios, Montreal
 New Beginnings (Radioland) – Recorded at: Reaction Studio, Toronto, Ontario
 The Atlantic Sessions (Koch) – Recorded July 19 & 20,1997 at Atlantimix Studios Halifax, Nova Scotia
 Reminiscence (Cornerstone) – Recorded at: Glenn Gould Studio,Toronto, July 15–17, 1994
 The Revellers (Unity) – Recorded: March 18 & 19, 1990 at Jazz Partners Studios, Toronto

As sideman

Compositions

Original compositions recorded

As leader 

SONGBOOK VOL. I (ADDO Jazz Recordings)
New Piece
Manhattan Getaway
Moulage
Calendula
By Invitation Only
Fleeting
Goodbye Glenn

FAMILY SUITE (Romhog Records)
Movement I
Movement II
Movement III
Movement IV
Movement V
Movement VI
Movement VII
Movement VIII
Movement IX
Movement X
Movement XI

PURE AND SIMPLE (Justin Time)
New Piece
Alicante
Opal Essence
Five By Five

NEW BEGINNINGS (Radioland)
On The Sierra Nevada
Starlight
Lament For A Better Tomorrow
Sideways
Kirk's Blues
Calendula
New Beginnings

THE ATLANTIC SESSIONS (KOCH Jazz)
The Mill Dam
Kirk's Blues
Monkie's Uncle
1000 West
Two Night Stand

REMINISCENCE (Counterpoint)
Reminiscence
Advance Notice
Moulage
Deep Shadows
Manhattan Getaway
For Melvin
Moon In Pisces
Portrait Of Lucie

THE REVELLERS (Unity-Page)
224 Blues
Forward Motion
The Revellers
Carnival

THE POWER OF BEAUTY (A Tribute To Stan Getz) (Various Artists) (Radioland)
517

Original compositions recorded by other artists 

SIGNAL Andre White (Cornerstone)
By Invitation Only
Goodbye Glen

SHAPESHIFT Keiran Overs (Unity-Page)
Moon In Pisces

THE WITCHES OF RED BEARD Chris Mitchell (KOCH-Jazz)
The Buddy System
You See But You Don't Hear

SPECTRUM Chris Mitchell (Justin Time)
Vanda Justina
Fleeting
The Torch Bearers

LA DOLCE VITA New Berlin Chamber Ensemble (NBCE)
Moulage

SECOND DEBUT Joe Coughlin (Innovation)
Spring
Lyric Waltz For A Libra Lady
Seascape

UNDER A TREE Toronto Jazz Orchestra (TJO Records)
Alicante (arranged by Mike Smith)

AWAKENING University of Toronto 10 O'Clock Jazz Orchestra (UTJ)
Calendula (arranged by Terry Promane)

References 

JUNO Awards Database: Artist Summary

External links 
 
JUNO Awards

Canadian jazz composers
Male jazz composers
Hard bop saxophonists
1959 births
Living people
Juno Award for Jazz Album of the Year – Solo winners
Canadian jazz saxophonists
Male saxophonists
Juno Award for Traditional Jazz Album of the Year winners
21st-century saxophonists
21st-century Canadian male musicians